Peppy Campus (born 12 January 1869, date of death unknown) was an Italian sports shooter. He competed in five events at the 1920 Summer Olympics.

References

External links
 

1869 births
Year of death missing
Italian male sport shooters
Olympic shooters of Italy
Shooters at the 1920 Summer Olympics
Place of birth missing